The Nasarawa State House of Assembly is the unicameral legislature of Nasarawa State in Nigeria. The House of Assembly consists of 24 members, including a Speaker and Deputy Speaker. The legislature is seated in Lafia, the capital city of Nasarawa State.

References

 
State legislatures of Nigeria
Government of Nasarawa State
Lafia
Unicameral legislatures